Authentic Movement grew out of an inner-directed approach to movement developed by Mary Starks Whitehouse that was described as unpremeditated, genuine, or “authentic.” Mary called her work “Movement-in-depth.”   Janet Adler developed this approach into a practice involving a mover and a witness.

History 
Whitehouse (1911 – 1979) was a student of famed Martha Graham and Mary Wigman, who became a professional dancer and subsequent teacher. Informed by her interest in and experience with Jungian psychology, particularly active imagination, projection, and polarities, Whitehouse integrated her study of dance and Jung into a new embodied inquiry, “an approach, an orientation” toward allowing “the unconscious to express itself in movement.”  

Joan Chodorow (Jungian Analyst) and Janet Adler (Dance Movement Therapist and PhD in Mystical Studies) each studied with Mary Whitehouse. (Pallaro, 1999) Chodorow’s work is based in Jungian analysis, working with Active Imagination in Movement, developmental psychology, intercultural elements, archetypes, dreams, and play. Adler’s teaching of the Discipline of Authentic Movement has focused on the development of the inner witness and the study of mystical elements such as clear seeing, intuition, direct experience, and energetic phenomenon. (Adler, 2022).

Practice 
When starting a basic AM session, participants start in a comfortable position, eyes closed to sense their inner body-mind processes.  They then wait for stimuli to arise within them, and follow each impulse expressing movement or sound. Individuals move through the space entirely free from any direction or expectation.  This allows people to explore psychological processes as they arise into kinesthetic responses of movement or sound.

As Whitehouse explains, "When the movement was simple and inevitable, not to be changed no matter how limited or partial, it became what I called 'authentic' – it could be recognized as genuine, belonging to that person."   The movement becomes 'authentic' when the individual is able to allow their intuitive impulses to freely express themselves without intellectual directive, as opposed to movement initiated by conscious decision making – a distinction which may appear clear, but practically a challenge.  Individuals simply pay attention to what they feel at a sensory level, since "the core of the movement experience is the sensation of moving and being moved."

In the Authentic Movement aspect of Whitehouse's approach, the moving participants (movers) are witnessed by an outer witness, who 'contains' the experience of the mover by witnessing their movements without judgement, projection or interpretation.  In this way, the witness is also an active participant, as witnessing is a practice in observing one's own sensations and impulses while observing the mover's. It's important to note that Whitehouse created many individual, dyadic and group experiences to create a context for moving from inner sensation and whole-body experience.  M.S.Whitehouse brought up two main figures in this field. Joan Chodorow and Janet Adler. Both women are cultivating and teaching this therapeutic/somatic art in two very different directions. While Joan Chodorow is based in Jungian analysis, working with Active Imagination in Movement, developmental psychology, intercultural elements, archetypes, dreams, and play, Janet Adler is anchored in Buddhist psychology, Mindfulness and mysticism. Adler coined her approach in the term " The Discipline of Authentic Movement" in order to distinguish the course of this practice.

The Authentic Movement Institute, co-founded by Neala Haze and Tina Stromsted in Berkeley, California, offered an intensive training program in the study and practice of Authentic Movement.  Joined by Chodorow and Adler as founding faculty, and adjunct teachers in areas of special focus, their program served students who are among those teaching and practicing Authentic Movement today in a wide range of countries.

Subsequent generations of practitioners have furthered moving and witnessing practice, including diverse perspectives and applications in the arts, education, analytic/therapeutic training, medical recovery, differing levels of physical abilities, diversity awareness, conflict mediation, meditation, sacred dance, mystical practice, and eco-psychology.

Authentic Movement, in a similar way to Elsa Gindler's 'Human Work' in concentration, has revealingly comparable elements to several forms of Eastern Buddhist philosophy.  The close attention that is paid to sensation, which as Vedanā in most Buddhist practices is to be observed without judgment, suggests Whitehouse may have been influenced by this.  Also, the term witness has been widely used in Buddhism referring to the aspect of the individual that is capable of observing other aspects of him/herself without judgement or discernment.  Buddhism has a long history in United States, and gave rise in the 1950s in particular with the work of D. T. Suzuki through works such as Outlines of Mahayana Buddhism and An Introduction to Zen Buddhism.  In this light, AM can also be seen as a type of moving meditation.

With many different approaches, exercises or practices (other than the basic practice above), AM is done not only in therapeutic sessions, but also as groups for personal expression of the unconscious mind.  For many, it is a type of spiritual practice.

Notes

References 
Adler, Janet (2022). Who is the Witness? In B. Morrissey & P. Sager (Eds.), Intimacy in Emptiness: An Evolution of Embodied Consciousness. Rochester, VT: Inner Traditions. (Original work, 1987).
Adler, Janet. (2002). Offering from the Conscious Body: The Discipline of Authentic Movement. Rochester, VT: Inner Traditions.
Chodorow, Joan (1991). Dance therapy and depth psychology: The moving imagination.  London, UK: Routledge.
Chodorow, Joan (1997). Jung on active imagination. Princeton, NJ: Princeton University Press.
Corrigall, J., Payne, H., & Wilkinson H. (Eds.). (2006). About a body: Working with the embodied mind in psychotherapy. New York: Routledge.
Foster, Mary Ann. (2004). Somatic Patterning: How to Improve Posture and Movement and Ease Pain. Colorado: EMS Press.
Morrissey, Bonnie & Sager, P. (Eds.), (2022). Intimacy in Emptiness: An Evolution of Embodied Consciousness. Rochester, VT: Inner Traditions. (Collected writings of Janet Adler, 1968-2022).
Pallaro, Patrizia (Ed.). (2007). Authentic Movement: Moving the Body, Moving the Self, Being Moved: A Collection of Essays Volume II. Philadelphia: Jessica Kingsley Publishers.
Pallaro, Patrizia (Ed.), (1999). Authentic movement: Essays by Mary Starks Whitehouse, Janet Adler, and Joan Chodorow. London, England: Jessica Kingsley Publishers.  
Stromsted, T. & Haze, N. (2007). The road in: Elements of the study and practice of authentic movement. In P. Pallaro (Ed.), Authentic Movement: Moving the body, moving the self, being moved: A collection of essays. Volume II. Philadelphia: Jessica Kingsley Publishers, 56–68.
Stromsted, T. (Summer, 2009). Authentic Movement: A dance with the divine. Body Movement and Dance in Psychotherapy Journal. 4(3), 201–213.
Whitehouse, Mary Starks (1999). The Transference and Dance Therapy.  In P. Pallaro (Ed.), Authentic movement: Essays by Mary Starks Whitehouse, Janet Adler, and Joan Chodorow (p. 64). London, England: Jessica Kingsley Publishers. (Original work published 1977).
Whitehouse, Mary Starks (1999). In P. Pallaro (Ed.), Authentic Movement: Essays by Mary Starks Whitehouse, Janet Adler, and Joan Chodorow. London, UK: Jessica Kingsley. (Original work, 1958).

External links 

Authentic Movement in Canada
Authentic Movement Community website
Authentic Movement Institute historical website, containing many resources

Manual therapy